Metarranthis apiciaria, the barrens metarranthis moth, is a moth in the family Geometridae that is native to North America. The species was first described by Packard in 1876. It is listed as endangered in Massachusetts, and as a species of special concern in Connecticut.

References

Ennominae